Gee is an unincorporated community located in Anderson County, Kentucky, United States. Its post office  is closed.

Some say Gee was named after the local Gee family, while others believe the name's brevity caused it to be selected.

References

Unincorporated communities in Anderson County, Kentucky
Unincorporated communities in Kentucky